Eurytemora is a genus of copepods in the family Temoridae. The World Register of Marine Species lists the following species:

Species
Eurytemora affinis (Poppe, 1880)
Eurytemora americana Williams, 1906
Eurytemora arctica Wilson M.S. & Tash, 1966
Eurytemora asymmetrica Smirnov, 1935
Eurytemora bilobata Akatova, 1949
Eurytemora brodskyi Kos, 1993
Eurytemora canadensis Marsh, 1920
Eurytemora carolleeae Alekseev & Souissi, 2011
Eurytemora caspica Sukhikh & Alekseev, 2013
Eurytemora clausii (Hoek, 1876)
Eurytemora composita Keiser, 1929
Eurytemora foveola Johnson M.W., 1961
Eurytemora gracilicauda Akatova, 1949
Eurytemora gracilis (Sars G.O., 1898)
Eurytemora grimmi (Sars G.O., 1897)
Eurytemora herdmani Thompson I.C. & Scott A., 1897 in Thompson, Scott & Herdman, 1897
Eurytemora kurenkovi Borutsky, 1961
Eurytemora lacinulata (Fischer, 1853)
Eurytemora lacustris (Poppe, 1887)
Eurytemora minor Behning, 1938
Eurytemora pacifica Sato, 1913
Eurytemora raboti Richard, 1897
Eurytemora richingsi Heron & Damkaer, 1976
Eurytemora velox (Lilljeborg, 1853)
Eurytemora wolterecki Mann, 1940
Eurytemora yukonensis Wilson M.S., 1953

References

Temoridae
Copepod genera